The Hollywood Actor Award is a category of the Hollywood Film Awards held annually since 1999.

External links
 

Awards established in 1999
Awards for male actors
Actress Award
1999 establishments in California